"Goodbye Media Man" is Tom Fogerty's self-penned debut single released in April 1971, shortly after leaving Creedence Clearwater Revival. The song is one of Fogerty's most successful singles, becoming a minor hit on the US Cash Box charts, making the Top 20 in Argentina, Top 40 in Germany, and bubbling under the Billboard Hot 100.

Reception

A Cash Box Magazine "Newcomer Picks" singles reviews page dated July 31, 1971 states the following about the single: "First solo effort by Tom still reveals shades of the current Creedence sound. Driving rhythms should guarantee single its place on the pop charts."

A Record World Picks of The Week singles reviews dated July 31, 1971 gives another view: "Brother Tom's first post-Creedence solo venture will really grow on listeners. Its message is a topical one. He wrote and plays with Merl Saunders and Bill Vitt."

Charts

References 

Tom Fogerty songs
1971 songs